Edward Vilga (born Manchester, Connecticut) is an American wellness authority and author of books, plays, and films. His work is often themed around transformation, connections between spirituality and wealth, and the power of forgiveness and stems from his experiences as an American yoga teacher. Edward Vilga graduated from Yale University after majoring in English Literature.

Career

After graduating from Yale, Vilga held many jobs in film projection, beginning by work for documentary filmmaker Helen C. Whitney. He was also the associate producer of "Tilt 23 1/2," an international television news magazine produced by Fujisanskei Communications that aired in 72 countries. Edward Vilga produced numerous Off-Broadway productions with Watermark Theater, including the Obie Award-Winning My Left Breast by Susan Miller. He then began writing, directing and producing his own projects in a variety of media.

Books 
Vilga is the author of Yoga in Bed (Running Press; 2005) and Yoga for Suits (Running Press; 2006) which have been translated into more than a dozen languages. Those books and DVDs have been featured in People Magazine, Oprah’s O Magazine, and LIVE WITH KELLY!

He also wrote Acting Now: Conversations on Craft and Career (Rutgers University Press; 1997), a collection of interviews.

Edward Vilga’s novel Downward Dog was released in paperback by Diversion Books in June 2014. The novel incorporates yoga poses (Asanas) and paints a humorously unflattering picture of a man of the world who decides to become a private yoga teacher in New York society.

His book The Yoga of Money Manifesto was released by Stone Heap Publishing in March 2017 and hit #1 for all of New Thought.

Theater 
"Miracle in Rwanda," a play Edward Vilga directed and co-created with performer Leslie Lewis, has toured the world with more than 150 performances over 6 continents. The Village Voice said that Lewis’ "one-woman performance makes riveting theater". Broadway Baby called the piece “An engaging and important theatrical work with absolutely no gimmicks" and noted that "with the combination of the strong performance and beautiful writing, Miracle in Rwanda is an absolute must-see."

“Miracle In Rwanda” had a six week Off-Broadway run in April and May 2019 at the Lion Theater.

The play was also featured at the United Nations in a special performance for the 25th Commemoration of the 1994 genocide against the Tutsi in Rwanda.

Film 
Vilga wrote and directed the feature film "Dead Broke" (Warner Brothers DVD, 2006). It won several best direct-to-DVD awards and on May 3, 1999 in a joint venture with the TriBeCa Film Center, Microsoft and ifilm.com, became the first film to debut simultaneously on the Internet and the big screen.

Edward Vilga also associate produced the independent film “With Child” (Summer Hill Films, 2014) which was nominated for Best World Showcase at the Soho Film Festival. The Hollywood Reporter said, “An auspicious feature debut with this comedy-drama…. With Child displays a refreshing quirkiness bolstered by its clever screenplay, which features a multitude of funny one-liners.”

Online Courses 
Edward Vilga is the creator of six bestselling courses on DailyOM, particularly "A Year to Get Rich With Purpose" that currently has over 30,000 students enrolled.

He is also a regular wellness contributor to Mind Body Green and Everyday Health.

Works

Books

The Yoga of Money Manifesto (2017) Stone Heap Publishing. 
Downward Dog (2014) Diversion Books. 
Upward Dog (2010) CreateSpace Independent Publishing. 
 Yoga for Suits (2006) Running Press. 
 Yoga in Bed (2005) Running Press. 
 Acting Now: Conversations on Craft and Career (1997) Rutgers University Press.

Theater

 Miracle in Rwanda

Film

 Dead Broke (Warner Brothers DVD, 2006)

References

External links
 Edward Vilga Home Page    
 About Edward Vilga   
 Artist, Writer, Director Edward Vilga
 Interview: Author Edward Vilga- Author of the new book, Downward Dog
 

American male writers
Year of birth missing (living people)
Living people